Acetoanaerobium noterae is a bacterium from the family Peptostreptococcaceae. For some time, it was the only described species of the genus Acetoanaerobium. A. noterae is an anaerobic bacterium that produces acetate from H2 and CO2.

Etymology
The name Acetoanaerobium derives from the Latin noun acetum, vinegar; Greek prefix an (ἄν), not; Greek noun aer, aeros (ἀήρ, ἀέρος), air; Greek noun bios (βίος), life; New Latin neuter gender noun Acetoanaerobium, vinegar anaerobe. The specied epitet noterae is the New Latin genitive case noun noterae, of Notera; named for its source, the Notera oil exploration site in the Hula  swamp area of  Galilee,  Israel. <ref name=LPSN>

References

Bacteria described in 1985
Peptostreptococcaceae